The siege of Rometta was a successful siege of the Byzantine city of Rometta, in northeastern Sicily, by the Kalbids on behalf of the Fatimid Dynasty, that took place between 963 and 965 and marked the conclusion of the Muslim conquest of Sicily.

Siege 
The siege was led by the two Kalbid cousins al-Hasan ibn Ammar and Ahmad ibn al-Hasan al-Kalbi. In 962, Taormina was besieged and reduced by Ahmad, where the entire population was sold into slavery and the area was colonized by Muslim resettlers. Following the fall of Taormina in 962, the Kalbids moved north to Rometta. The next year Ahmad began the siege. The city soon sent an envoy to the Byzantine emperor, Nikephoros II Phokas, requesting military aid and provisions. Nikephoros responded by equipping a fleet of around 40,000 men, many of whom were veterans from the Byzantine conquest of Crete, for battle in Sicily. The fleet was commanded by Niketas Abalantes, while the cavalry was commanded by Manuel Phokas, a nephew of emperor Nikephoros through his brother, Leo Phokas the Younger. In October, 964, the siege was reinforced by Berber troops led by the emir of Sicily, al-Hasan ibn Ali al-Kalbi. On 25 October, the Byzantines and the Muslims engaged one another. The Byzantines were initially in control of the battle, however, the Muslims were soon able to rout them, supposedly killing more than a quarter of the force, including Phokas. The surviving Byzantines attempted to flee back to their fleet at Messina, but were ambushed upon departure in the Battle of the Straits and defeated. Without reinforcements, Rometta was unable to defend itself against the Kalbids and soon fell in May 965.

References

Sources 
 
 
 
 
 

960s in the Byzantine Empire
965
960s conflicts
Muslim conquest of Sicily
Sieges of the Byzantine–Fatimid wars
Rometta